Nemacheilus longipectoralis is a species of ray-finned fish in the genus Nemacheilus.

Footnotes 
 

L
Fish described in 1905
Taxa named by Canna Maria Louise Popta